Silene ovata, the Blue Ridge catchfly or ovate-leaved catchfly, is a herbaceous plant in the family Caryophyllaceae. This perennial plant grows up to 1.5 m tall and has large opposite leaves without petioles which are 5–12 cm long and taper to a long point, 2–5 cm wide and numerous finely fringed white flowers with a tube.

Flowering
Jones lists the blooming season as from June to September.

Range
While unknown in Florida, it occurs in most of the southeastern United States from Georgia, eight widely scattered Alabama counties, to Mississippi and Arkansas (where it occurs only in eight counties in the Ozark region), north into southern Illinois and Indiana, Kentucky, and Virginia. The plants have a limited distribution range wide as indicated by their global G3 status.

Habitat
A flora of Kentucky lists the species as occurring in "dry to mesic forests" while the flora of North Carolina lists the habitat as "rich woods."

Chromosome count
2n = 48.

Conservation status
Silene ovata is listed as G3 on the NatureServe conservation status, meaning it is vulnerable and globally rare. Typically G3 species have 21 to 100 occurrences globally, or have 3,000 to 10,000 individuals globally.

Alabama S2.
Arkansas S3, Threatened.
Georgia
Illinois
Indiana
Kentucky S3, Threatened.
North Carolina
Tennessee
South Carolina
Virginia

References

ovata
Plants described in 1813
Flora of North America